Emma Magee (born 11 November 1997) is a Northern Ireland netball international and an Antrim ladies' Gaelic footballer. She was a member of the Northern Ireland team at the 2019 Netball World Cup. Her younger sister, Michelle Magee, is also a Northern Ireland netball international and an Antrim ladies' Gaelic footballer.

Early life, family and education
Magee was educated at St. Dominic's Grammar School where she played ladies' Gaelic football for the school team. Her younger sister, Michelle Magee, is also a Northern Ireland netball international and an Antrim ladies' Gaelic footballer. Their father, Jim Magee, is an assistant manager/coach with the senior Antrim ladies' Gaelic football team. Between 2016 and 2019, Magee attended Northumbria University where she gained a first class honours BA in Psychology with Sport and Exercise Science.

Netball

Clubs
At club level Magee has played for Westside in Northern Ireland.

Northern Ireland
Magee captained the Northern Ireland under-21 team at the 2017 Netball World Youth Cup. She was also a member of the senior Northern Ireland team at the 2019 Netball World Cup. Magee and her sister, Michelle, belong to a group of senior Ladies' Gaelic footballers who also play netball for Northern Ireland. Others include Michelle Drayne (Antrim),  Neamh Woods (Tyrone) and Caroline O'Hanlon (Armagh).

Gaelic games

Clubs
Magee has played ladies' Gaelic football at club level for St Brigids and Carryduff. In 2017 Emma and Michelle Magee were both members of the Carryduff team that won the Down Ladies' Senior Football Championship.

Inter-county
Emma and Michelle Magee have also represented Antrim in competitions such as the Ladies' National Football League and All-Ireland Junior Ladies' Football Championship. In 2019 Emma was a member of the Antrim team that won the Ulster Junior Ladies' Football Championship.

References

1997 births
Living people
Northern Ireland netball internationals
2019 Netball World Cup players
Sportspeople from Belfast
Carryduff Gaelic footballers
Antrim ladies' Gaelic footballers
People educated at St Dominic's Grammar School for Girls
Alumni of Northumbria University